Arthur Korn (20 May 1870 – 21 December/22 December 1945) was a German physicist, mathematician and inventor. He was involved in the development of the fax machine, specifically the transmission of photographs or telephotography, known as the Bildtelegraph, related to early attempts at developing a practical mechanical television system.

Life 
Born in Breslau, Korn was the son of a Jewish couple, Moritz and Malwine Schottlaender. He attended gymnasia in Breslau and Berlin. He then studied physics and mathematics in Leipzig at the age of 15, from where he graduated in 1890. Afterwards, he studied in Berlin, Paris, London and Würzburg. In 1895, he became a lecturer in law at the University of Munich, and was appointed professor in 1903. In 1914, he accepted the chair of physics at the Berlin Institute of Technology.

Dr. Korn, being of Jewish descent, was dismissed from his post in 1935 with the rise of the Nazi Party. In 1939 he left Germany with his family and moved to the United States, entering via Mexico. There, he took the chair in physics and mathematics at Stevens Institute of Technology in Hoboken, New Jersey. He died in Jersey City, New Jersey, in 1945.

Telecommunication pioneer 
Korn experimented and wrote on long-distance photography, the phototelautograph.
He pioneered the use of light sensitive selenium cells which supplanted the function of the stylus, and used a Nernst lamp as a light source. On 17 October 1906, he transmitted a photograph of Crown Prince William over a distance of 1800 km.

At a 1913 conference in Vienna, Korn demonstrated the first successful visual telegraphic transmission of a cinematic recording. Under heavy media attention in 1923, he successfully transmitted an image of Pope Pius XI across the Atlantic Ocean, from Rome to Bar Harbor, Maine, the picture being hailed as a "miracle of modern science". From 1928 onwards, the German police used Korn's system to send photographs and fingerprints, though the use of the "phototelegraph" in apprehending a thief from a Stuttgart bank in London was recorded in 1907, as well as the use of the technology by the media, with the French paper l'Illustration contracting for a French monopoly that lasted until 1909.

He also worked on potential theory and the mathematics of physics. He was an Invited Speaker for the ICM in 1908 in Rome and in 1932 in Zürich.

Works 

 Eine Theorie der Gravitation und der elektrischen Erscheinungen auf Grundlage der Hydrodynamik (2nd ed., 1896)
 Ueber Molecular-Funktion (1897)
 Lehrbuch der Potentialtheorie (Berlin, 1899–1901)
 Freie und erzwungene Schwingungen (1910)
 Handbuch der Phototelegraphie (1911)
 Bildrundfunk with Eugen Nesper (1926)
He also contributed numerous articles to such journals as Berichte der Bayrischen Akademie der Wissenschaft, Comptes Rendus de l'Académie des Sciences, and Naturwissenschaftliches Wochenschrift.

See also 
 History of television
 Mechanical television
 German inventors and discoverers
 Granino A. Korn, son
 Theresa M. Korn, daughter-in-law and biographer of Arthur Korn

References

External links 

 
 HF-Fax Fascimile & SSTV History

1870 births
1945 deaths
20th-century German physicists
Stevens Institute of Technology faculty
Jewish emigrants from Nazi Germany to the United States
Academic staff of the Ludwig Maximilian University of Munich
Academic staff of the Technical University of Berlin
Leipzig University alumni
Scientists from Wrocław
Jewish physicists